Father Is a Dog is a 2010 South Korean drama film written and directed by South Korean indie provocateur Lee Sang-woo. The second instalment of Lee's thematic "bad family" trilogy, the first being Mother Is a Whore (2011), it describes the relationship of a father and his unknown sons. It world premiered at the 15th Busan International Film Festival in 2010.

Cast
 Kwan Bum-tack as Father
 Lee Tae-rim as Gwang-soo
 Lee Si-ho as Gwang-heon
 Kim Hun as Gwang-yeol
 Yoo Ae-kyung as Crazy woman

References

External links
 
 

2010 films
South Korean drama films
2010s Korean-language films
Films directed by Lee Sang-woo
2010s South Korean films